Maria Menounos (born June 8, 1978) is an American journalist, television presenter and actress. She has hosted Extra and E! News; she was a TV correspondent for Today, Access Hollywood, and co-hosted the Eurovision Song Contest 2006 in Athens, Greece. She also co-created and is currently CEO of online podcast series network AfterBuzz TV. She is currently signed to WWE where she has served as an ambassador since 2013. She hosts the podcast Conversations with Maria Menounos.

Early life 
Menounos was born in the Boston suburb of Medford, Massachusetts, to Greek immigrant parents Costas and Litsa Menounos who worked as janitors in a Boston nightclub. She has a younger brother named Peter. Maria Menounos attended the Dormition of the Virgin Mary Greek Orthodox Church in Somerville, Massachusetts. She also attended Medford High School in Medford.

In 1995, Menounos began to compete in beauty pageants. The following year, she won the title of Miss Massachusetts Teen USA, and she competed at Miss Teen USA where she placed in the top 15, receiving an honorary mention, during the preliminary competition. She placed 13th in the preliminaries. She competed for the title of Miss Massachusetts USA 2000 and was the first runner-up.

Menounos attended Boston's Emerson College participating there in the organization Emerson Independent Video. She graduated from Emerson in 2000.

Career

Film, television, and radio 
During her senior year at Emerson, Menounos worked as a reporter for Channel One News. For her 10-minute segments, she traveled to El Salvador to report on the January 2001 and February 2001 earthquakes, interviewed NATO aircrew members aboard an E-3 AWACS plane during the military alliance's Operation Eagle Assist, and interviewed President George W. Bush.

Entertainment Tonight hired Menounos as a correspondent in 2002; she reported on movies, music, and fashion. She left the program in 2005 to focus on her acting career, although she joined rival program Access Hollywood that fall as a correspondent. She went on to co-host a few episodes of the Today show in the late summer and fall of 2006 as well as in April 2007. In 2003, she appeared on the November 30 episode of Punk'd as one of many celebrities caught in the awkward and embarrassing "Red Carpet Interviews".

In 2004, Menounos appeared in an episode of the UPN series One on One as Glenda, an eccentric, self-proclaimed "Fairy Godmother to the Stars". In the summer of 2005, she appeared in the comic book film Fantastic Four playing a nurse romanced by the Human Torch who is played by Chris Evans. Her likeness and voice was featured in the 2005 Electronic Arts video game James Bond 007: From Russia with Love as Eva Adara, Red Grant's henchwoman, which stars Sean Connery as James Bond. She is also the spokesperson for Pantene hair products. Menounos presented the 2006 Eurovision Song Contest (along with Greek singer Sakis Rouvas) which took place in Athens. Menounos also directed Longtime Listener starring Wilmer Valderrama. The film was an official selection of the Tribeca Film Festival 2006. She acted in and produced Adventures of Serial Buddies, which is credited with being the first serial killer buddy comedy.

At the age of 17, Menounos produced In the Land of Merry Misfits, an independent film fairy tale. The 35 mm feature film was produced by Menounos while attending Emerson College with director Keven Undergaro, then head writer for MTV's Singled Out. The negative of the film was stolen and the film was never completed but her work on the film, and the film's director, helped her land her reporting job at Channel One News and at MTV (ET on MTV). She however, never forgot the film or the film's director. In 2005, she personally funded the recovery and restoration of the film, which was narrated by John Waters and starred an eclectic group in the Waters vein — including former WWE champion Bob Backlund, actress Josie Davis from the TV show Charles in Charge, and B-movie icon Randal Malone. The film premiered at the 2007 Tribeca Film Festival.

Menounos also maintains AfterBuzzTV, an online entertainment network she founded with Undergaro, for which she was named the 2014 CES Entertainment Matters Ambassador. As an actress, she had recurring roles on the CBS-TV program Without a Trace and as Jules in the second season of The CW's One Tree Hill (during its run on The WB). Menounos also appeared on the Scrubs episode "My Extra Mile", which aired in May 2006 where she is attracted to John Dorian because she likes his hair. In 2006, she appeared in the music video for "A Public Affair" by Jessica Simpson. On April 27, 2007, Menounos starred in Kickin' It Old Skool. In 2007, she continued in her run as international spokesperson doing print and television commercials for Pantene hair products as well as print ads for New York & Company. From December 17 to 20, 2007, she hosted the reality game show miniseries Clash of the Choirs.

In 2008, she became the host of Hollywood Green on the Planet Green network. In 2008, she had a role in the movie Tropic Thunder, and in the same year became the first (and to date the only) journalist to interview the entire Obama family as a whole. She also reported for NBC Nightly News.

In May 2008, Menounos played in the AVP Cuervo Gold Crown Huntington Beach Open but was eliminated in the qualifying round. On July 13, 2008, she played in the celebrity softball game at Yankee Stadium in New York. In November 2008, when Richard Belzer fell ill, she filled in as host for the North Shore Animal League's Dogcatemy Celebrity Gala, which is held at NYC's Capitale. From 2009 to 2012 she hosted various reunion specials of MTV's The Real World and The Challenge. She appeared on the 2008 Knight Rider series episode "Fly By Knight", which aired on February 11, 2009; she played a DEA agent who is in charge of investigating a plane crash.

On August 4, 2011, it was announced that she would join Warner Bros.'s Extra, where she co-hosted the show with Mario Lopez. She also had on-air duties at Dr. Drew's Lifechangers, with plans to develop new projects. For her work on Extra, Menounos won a Daytime Emmy Award for Outstanding Entertainment News Program.

She was a contestant on the 14th season of Dancing with the Stars partnering with Derek Hough. The couple was eliminated on May 15, 2012 placing fourth in the competition. In May 2013, Menounos began a new interview series called Conversations with Maria Menounos; Zoe Saldana being her first guest.

On March 18, 2014, Menounos' reality TV series Chasing Maria Menounos premiered on the Oxygen Network.

In May 2014, after three years of hosting Extra, Menounos left the show signing a multi-year contract with E! Entertainment to host and produce several programs. In July 2015, The Hollywood Reporter announced that she would replace Giuliana Rancic as the co-anchor of E! News. In July 2017, Menounos stepped down due to an ongoing battle with a brain tumor.

In late 2015, it was announced that Menounos would host a daily, one-hour radio show on SiriusXM called Conversations with Maria on Stars 109. She continues to host a pre-movie show named Noovie.

In 2020, GSTV announced a partnership to air short-form videos called Better Together with Maria Menounos on GSTV-affiliated gas pump video screens in more than 28,000 locations. The brief videos feature Menounos providing tips for physical and emotional health, relationship advice, and other wellness-based information. 

In June 2021, Menounos hosted the reunion show for season one of The Challenge: All Stars, a special-limited series of the MTV reality-competition series The Challenge, alongside Nate Burleson. In December 2021, Menounos hosted the reunion show for the 37th season of the main series of The Challenge, titled The Challenge: Spies, Lies & Allies.

Professional wrestling
Menounos is a long-time WWE fan and has made several appearances with WWE. Her first appearance was on October 12, 2009; Menounos joined Nancy O'Dell and guest hostedWWE Raw. She made her in-ring debut that night in a six diva tag team match with Gail Kim and Kelly Kelly against Alicia Fox, Beth Phoenix, and Rosa Mendes; Menounos' team was victorious; a highlight was Menounos slapping the much larger-stature Phoenix.

On December 11, 2011, at WWE Tribute to the Troops, Menounos returned and teamed with Alicia Fox, Eve Torres, and Kelly Kelly to defeat the team of The Bella Twins (Brie and Nikki) and The Divas of Doom (Phoenix and Natalya). Menounos got the win for her team by pinning Phoenix.

Menounos continued her feud with WWE Divas Champion Phoenix after Phoenix and Eve Torres interrupted an interview segment with Kelly Kelly on Extra. This led to a tag team match at WrestleMania XXVIII with Menounos teaming with Kelly Kelly to take on Phoenix and Torres. Despite suffering two cracked ribs during practice for Dancing with the Stars before the match, Menounos and Kelly were successful in defeating Phoenix and Torres on April 1, 2012, at WrestleMania, with Menounos pinning Phoenix for the win.

On April 6, 2013, at Madison Square Garden, Menounos inducted Bob Backlund into the WWE Hall of Fame. On August 18, 2013, at SummerSlam Axxess, she teamed with Natalya defeating Brie Bella and Eva Marie.

On August 17, 2014, Menounos was seen at the SummerSlam pay-per-view, appearing in the crowd and later in a backstage segment with Stephanie McMahon, who accepted Menounos's challenge for the ALS Ice Bucket Challenge. Menounos was actually nominated by McMahon's father and chairman of WWE, Vince McMahon.

She has hosted the WWE Hall of Fame red carpet pre-show for six years in a row (2014-2019). She also appeared during the event as a guest backstage interviewer for WrestleMania 31, WrestleMania 32 and WrestleMania 33. In 2016, Menounos appeared in one episode of the WWE Network's Swerved and was a backstage interviewer for SummerSlam. On January 28, 2018, she was the special guest ring announcer for the first-ever women's Royal Rumble match at the Royal Rumble.

Charity work 
In a 2008 NBC interview, Menounos shared she has been involved in charity work since age 13 and has always wanted to be able to help many causes in the charity world.

Menounos founded the charity "Take Action Hollywood!" after her trip to South Africa, where she reported on the effects of the AIDS crisis there. She created the Cosmo Girl Cup, a national, annual competition and award given to the group of teens who do the most in their communities to affect for positive social change. Menounos presented at the Earth Day Network's Climate Rally in Washington, DC on April 25, 2010. in 2012 Menounos took part in Red Cross's and AMC joint effort to raise awareness for donating blood.

Books
 The Everygirl's Guide to Life (2001) 
 The Everygirl's Guide to Diet and Fitness (2014) 
 The Everygirl's Guide to Cooking (2016) 
 Better Together (2021)

Personal life 
In 2012, Menounos posed nude for the May issue of Allure magazine.

In the same year, Menounos told Howard Stern that she had previously been sexually abused by two different doctors during medical examinations.

In April 2017, she had surgery to remove a meningioma, an intracranial tumor which was benign.

Menounos married Keven Undergaro in Times Square during the 2017 New Year's festivities in a ceremony officiated by Steve Harvey and then again in a 2018 Orthodox wedding in Akovos, Greece.

On February 7, 2023, Menounos and her husband announced they were having a baby with the aid of a surrogate.

Accolades 
She was Spike TV's 2005 "Cyber Vixen of the Year", and the 2010 Madden NFL Pro-AM MVP. In 2014 Extra, which she co-hosts, won the Daytime Emmy award for Outstanding Entertainment News Program.

Filmography

Films

Television

References

External links

 
 
 
 
 

1978 births
Living people
21st-century American actresses
Actresses from Massachusetts
Entertainment journalists
American film actresses
American television reporters and correspondents
American writers of Greek descent
Emerson College alumni
American television actresses
1996 beauty pageant contestants
20th-century Miss Teen USA delegates
Participants in American reality television series
Sportspeople from Medford, Massachusetts
American women television journalists